Barry Stuart Tait (17 June 1938 – 23 October 2020) was an English professional footballer who played as an inside forward.

Career
Born in York, Tait played for Doncaster Rovers, York City, Peterborough United, Bradford City, Halifax Town, Crewe Alexandra, Notts County and Scarborough. He later worked as assistant coach and scout for York City, watched players for Manchester United and set up a development centre in York for Leeds United. He also served as manager of York Railway Institute.

References

1938 births
2020 deaths
Footballers from York
English footballers
Association football inside forwards
Doncaster Rovers F.C. players
York City F.C. players
Peterborough United F.C. players
Bradford City A.F.C. players
Halifax Town A.F.C. players
Crewe Alexandra F.C. players
Notts County F.C. players
Scarborough F.C. players
English Football League players
York City F.C. non-playing staff
English football managers